Semyon Izrailevich Lipkin (6 September (19, New Style) 1911 – 31 March 2003) was a Russian writer, poet, and literary translator.

Lipkin's importance as a poet was recognized once his work became available to the general reading public after the collapse of the Union of Soviet Socialist Republics (USSR). Throughout much of his working life, he was sustained by the support of his wife, poet Inna Lisnianskaya, and close friends such as Anna Akhmatova, Joseph Brodsky and Alexander Solzhenitsyn (who thought him a genius and championed his poetry). Lipkin's verse includes explorations of history and philosophy, and exhibits a keen sense of peoples' diverse destinies. His poems include references to his Jewish heritage and the Bible. They also draw on first-hand experience of the tragedies of Stalin's Great Purge and World War II (WWII). Lipkin's long-standing opposition to the Soviet regime surfaced in 1979-80 when he contributed to the uncensored almanac "Metropol"; he and Lisnianskaya then left the ranks of the official Writer's Union of the USSR.

Early years 
Lipkin was born in Odessa, as the child of Israel and Rosalia Lipkin. Semyon Lipkin was of Jewish ethnicity. His father had a tailoring business and was active in the Menshevik movement. According to Lipkin, his father took him to Odessa's Main Synagogue where he discussed politics with figures such as Hayyim Nahman Bialik. His early education included Hebrew and Torah instruction alongside his studies at a gymnasium. This was disrupted by the Bolshevik Revolution in 1917 and by the 1918-20 Civil War. Lipkin spent a lot of time reading and educating himself at home. In 1929 he left Odessa for Moscow, where he studied engineering and economics and graduated from the Moscow Engineering-Economic Institute in 1937. While studying there, he had begun to teach himself Persian followed by the other languages of the oriental regions, which were disappearing as a result of Russification, including Northeast Caucasian languages, Kalmyk, Kirghiz, Kazakh, Tatar, Tajik and Uzbek, together with their histories and cultures.

Military career 

Lipkin's military career started with the German invasion in June 1941, when he was enlisted as a war correspondent with the military rank of senior lieutenant, at the Baltic Fleet base in Kronstadt near Leningrad. Later he was transferred to the 110th Kalmyk cavalry division (with which he got into the German encirclement), and then to the Volga River flotilla at Stalingrad. He took part in the Battle of Stalingrad in 1942-43 and covered its events as a journalist. Lipkin was awarded 4 military orders and several medals for his actions.

Literary career 

Lipkin published his first poem when he was aged 15 and Eduard Bagritsky recognized its merit.  It was not until he entered his sixth decade that the regime permitted him to publish his poetic work, and it wasn't until his seventh decade that recognition of his status as a poet was fully established, although Anna Akhmatova and Joseph Brodsky (the Nobel laureate) amongst others in his immediate circle, acknowledged the greatness of his poems.

In the 1930s Lipkin met the 20th-century Russian poets Osip Mandelstam, Anna Akhmatova and Marina Tsvetayeva, along with the prose writers Vasily Grossman and Andrey Platonov, all of whom were described in his memoir Kvadriga.

Lipkin is also renowned as a literary translator and often worked from the regional languages which Stalin tried to obliterate. In his translations, Lipkin was known for also learning about the culture of the languages he translated such as Abkhaz, Akkadian, Buryat, Dagestani, Karbardinian, Kalmyk, Kirghiz, Tatar, Tadjik-Farsi and Uzbek. Lipkin is also noted for hiding a typescript of his friend Vasily Grossman's magnum opus, Life and Fate, from the KGB and initiated the process that brought it to the West. Martin Amis remarked, "If it were for nothing else than the part he played in bringing Life and Fate to publication Semyon Izrailevich Lipkin would deserve to be remembered." 

Lipkin's extensive oeuvre of translation won many accolades. For his translations and literary work Lipkin was honoured with the title of Kalmykia national poet (1967) and later, Hero of Kalmykia (2001), People's Artist of Kabardino-Balkaria (1957), Outstanding Cultural Worker of the Uzbek Republic (1968), Rudaki State Prize of Tajik Republic (1967), Tukay State Prize of Tatarstan (1992), Andrey Sakharov "Courage in the Literature" Prize (1992), literary prizes of the magazines Ogoniok (1989) and "Luchnik (Archer)" (1994), and The Pushkin Prize of the Alfred Topfer Foundation (1995).

Poetry 

 Ochevidets [Eyewitness: poems of various years]. Elista: Kalmyk Book Publishers, 1967; 2nd Edition, 1974.
 Vechnyi den’ [Eternal Day]. Moscow: Sovetskii Pisatel, 1975.
 Volia [Free Will]; selected by Joseph Brodsky. Ann Arbor: Ardis, 1981; Moscow: O.G.I., 2003.
 Kochevoi Ogon’ [A Nomadic Flame]. Ann Arbor: Ardis, 1984.
 Kartiny i golosa [Pictures and Voices]. London: Overseas Publications Interchange, 1986.
 Lira. Stikhi raznyh let [Lyre. Verses of Various Years]. Moscow: Pravda, 1989.
 Lunnyi svet. Stikhotvoreniya i poemy [Moonlight. Verses and Poems]. Moscow: Sovremennik, 1991.
 Pis’mena. Stikhotvoreniya i poemy [Letters. Verses and Poems]. Moscow: Khudozhestvennaia Literatura, 1991.
 Pered zakhodom solntsa. Stikhi i perevody [Before the Sunset. Verses and Translations] Paris-Moscow-New York: Tretya Volna, 1995.
 Posokh [Shepherd's Crook]. Moscow: CheRo, 1997.
 Sobranie sochinenii v 4-kh tomakh [Collected works in 4 volumes]. Moscow: Vagrius, 1998.
 Sem’ desyatiletii [Seven Decades]. Moscow: Vozvrashchenie, 2000.
 Vmeste. Stikhi [Together, Verses. (Together with Inna Lisnianskaya)]. Moscow: Grail, Russkiy put’, 2000.
 Ochevidets [Eyewitness: selected poems]; compiled by Inna Lisnianskaya. Moscow: Vremia, 2008.

Prose 

 Stalingradsky korabl' [The Stalingrad Ship]. War stories, 1943.
 Dekada [Decade]. Novel, 1983.
 Stalingrad Vasiliya Grossmana [Stalingrad of Vasily Grossman], 1984.
 Zhizn' i sud'ba Vasiliya Grossmana [Life and Fate of Vasily Grossman]. Farewell (With Anna Berzer), 1990.
 Ugl' pylayuschiy ognyom [The Flaming Coal]. Sketches and Discourses, 1991.
 Zapiski zhil'tsa [The Notes of a Lodger], 1992.
 Vtoraya doroga [The Second Road], 1995.
 Kvadriga [Quadriga], 1997.

Translations by Semyon Lipkin 

Abkhaz
 Bagrat Shikuba, Moi zemlyaki [My Compatriots], a poem; transl. from Abkhaz by S. Lipkin and Ya. Kozlovsky. Moscow, 1967.

Akkadian 
 Gilgamesh; verse adaptation by Semyon Lipkin; afterword by Vyacheslav V. Ivanov. St. Petersburg: Pushkin Fund, 2001.

Buryat
 Geser [Geser, Buryat Heroic Epos]; Moscow: Khudozhestvennaia Literatura, 1968
 Derzhava rannikh zhavoronkov. Povest po motivam buryatskogo eposa [The State of Early Skylarks. A novella on the Motives of Buryat Epos]; a children's version by S. Lipkin. Moscow: Detgiz, 1968.

Dagestani 
 Dagestanskie liriki [Dagestani Lyric Poets]; translations by S.I. Lipkin and others. Leningrad: Sovetsky Pisatel, 1961.

Kabardian
 Shogentsukov, Ali. Poemy [Poems]; translated from Kabardian by Semyon Lipkin. Moscow: Sovetskii Pisatel’, 1949.
 Narty [Narts, Kabardian Epos]; translated by Semyon Lipkin. Moscow: Khudozhestvennaia Literatura, 1951.
 Kabardinskaia epicheskaya poezia [Kabardian Epic Poetry]; selected translations. Nal’chik, 1956.
 Debet Zlatolikii i ego druzia: Balkaro-Karachaev nartskii epos [Debet Goldenface and his friends: Karachai-Balkar Nart epic]; translated by S. Lipkin. Nal’chik: Elbrus, 1973.

Kalmyk
 Prikliyucheniya bogatyrya Samshura, prozvannogo Lotosom [Adventures of Hero Shamshur, Nicknamed Lotus], a children's adaptation of the Kalmyk epic story by Semyon Lipkin. Moscow: Detgiz, 1958.
 Dzhangar: Kalmytski narodny epos [Djangar: Kalmyk national epic]; translated by Semyon Lipkin. Elista: Kalmyk Book Publishers, 1971, repr. 1977.
 Dzhangar: Kalmytski narodny epos; novye pesni [Djangar: Kalmyk national epic; new songs]; poetic translations realised by V.N. Eremenko, S.I. Lipkin, Yu. M. Neiman. Elista: Kalmyk Book Publishers, 1990.

Kirghiz 
 Kirgizskii narodnyi epos “Manas” [Kirghiz Folk Epos Manas], transl. Semyon Lipkin and Mark Tarlovsky. Moscow: Khudozhestvennaia Literatura, 1941.
 Poetry Kirgizii: Stikhi 1941-1944 [Kirghiz Poets: Verses 1941-1944]; translated under the editorship of S. Lipkin. Moscow: Sovetskiy Pisatel’, 1946.
 Manas Velikodushny: povest [Manas the Magnanimous: a novella]; [version by S. Lipkin]. Leningrad, 1947.
 Manas: epizody iz kirgizskogo narodnogo eposa [Manas: episodes from the Kirghiz national epic]; translated by S. Lipkin and L. Penkovski. Moscow: Khudozhestvennaia Literatura, 1960.
 Manas Velikodushny. Povest’ o drevnikh kirghizskikh geroyakh [Manas the Magnanimous: a
 Story about Ancient Kirghiz Heroes; Riga: Polaris, 1995.

Sanskrit 
 Mahabharata (Indian epic). In: series Biblioteka vsemirnoi literatury, vol. 2, translated from Sanskrit by S. Lipkin. Moscow: Khudozhestvennaia Literatura, 1969.

Tatar 
 Poetry Tatarii, 1941-1944 [Poets of Tataria, 1941-1944]; edited by A. Erikeeva and S. Lipkin. Moscow: Sovetskii Pisatel’, 1945.
 Poeziya Sovetskoi Tatarii: Sbornik sostavlen Soiuzom Sovetskikh Pisatelei Tatarskoi ASSR [Poetry of Soviet Tataria: Collection compiled by the Union of Soviet Tatar Writers]; editor S.I. Lipkin [translations by various hands]. Moscow: Khudozhestvennaia Literatura, 1955.
 Idegei: tatarskii narodnyi epos [Idegei: Tatar national epic]; translated by Semyon Lipkin.
 Kazan’: Tatar Book Publishers, 1990.

Tadjik-Persian
 Firdawsi. Skazanie o Bakhrame Chubine [Epos about Bakhram Chubin], a fragment from poem Shāhnāmah translated from Tadjik-Persian by S. Lipkin. Stalinabad [Dushanbe]: Tadzhikgosizdat, 1952.
 Izbrannoe [Selections]; translated from Tadjik-Persian by V. Levik and S. Lipkin. Moscow, 1957.
 Firdawsi. Poėmy iz Shakh-namė [Poems from Shāhnāmah]; in translation by S. Lipkin. Stalinabad [Dushanbe]: Tadzhikgosizdat, 1959.
 Stranitsy Tadzhikskoy Poezii [Pages of Tadjik Poetry], ed. S. Lipkin, Stalinabad [Dushanbe]: Tadzikgosizdat, 1961.
 Rudaki, stikhi [Rudaki, verses], transl. S. Lipkin and V. Levik, ed. I. Braginsky. Moscow: Nauka, 1964.
 Tetrad’ bytiia [Book of Life]; Poetry in Tadjik dialect with Russian by Semyon Lipkin. Lipkin. Dushanbe: Irfon, 1977.

Uzbek 
 Khamid Alimdzhan. Oigul i Bakhtiyor [Oigul i Bakhtiyor]; Tashkent: Goslitizdat UzSSR, 1948.
 Lutfi. Gul I Navruz [Gul and Navruz, a poem]; transl. S.Lipkin. Tashkent: Goslitizdat UzSSR, 1959.
 Navoi, Leili i Medzhnun [Leili and Medjnun]; poem translated from Uzbek by Semyon Lipkin. Moscow: Goslitizdat, 1945; Moscow: Detgiz, 1948; Tashkent: Khudozhestvennaia
 Literatura, 1957; (In: A. Navoi. Poemy [Poems].), Moscow: Khudozhestvennaia Literatura, 1972.
 Navoi, Sem’ Planet [Seven Planets]; poem translated from Uzbek by Semyon Lipkin. Tashkent, 1948; Moscow, 1954; (In: A. Navoi. Poemy [Poems].), Moscow: Khudozhestvennaia Literatura, 1972.
 Golosa Shesti Stoletii [Voices of Six Centuries]; selected translations from Uzbek. Tashkent, 1960.
 Tsarevna iz goroda T’my [Princess from the City of Darkness]; children's story by S. Lipkin based on Uzbek tales. Moscow: Detgiz, 1961.
 Slovo i Kamen [Word and Stone], selected translations from Uzbek poetry by S. Lipkin, Tashkent: Gafur Gulyam Publ., 1977.

Other various languages 
 Stroki Mudrykh [Lines of the Wise Ones], coll. translations by S. Lipkin, Moscow: Sovetskiy Pisatel’, 1961.
 O bogatyriakh, umeltsakh i volshebnikhakh [On Heroes, Craftsmen and Wizards]; 3 novellas on Caucasian folklore motives, children's adaptation by S. Lipkin. Moscow: Detgiz, 1963.
 Zolotaya zep’ [The Golden Chain: Eastern Poems]; translated from Abkhaz, Tadzhik-Persian, old-Uzbek, etc. Moscow: Detgiz, 1970.
 Dalekie i Blizkie: Stikhi zarubezhnykh poetov v perevode [Far and Near: Verses by foreign poets in translation]; translators: Vera Markova, Semyon Lipkin, Aleksandr Gitovich. Moscow: Progress, 1978.

English translations of Semyon Lipkin’s work 
 After Semyon Izrailevich Lipkin, translation by Yvonne Green. London: Smith/Doorstop, 2011. A Poetry Book Society Recommended Translation. This treatment of Lipkin's verse is further discussed by Professor Donald Rayfield.
 Four poems translated by Albert C. Todd, in Twentieth Century Russian Poetry, selected with an introduction by Yevgeny Yevtushenko, edited by Albert C. Todd and Max Hayward, with Daniel Weissbort. New York: Doubleday; London: Fourth Estate, 1993.
 Two poems one translated by Yvonne Green and one by Robert Chandler in The Penguin Book of Russian Poetry 
 Two poems translated by Daniel Weissbort. Cardinal Points Literary Journal, No. 12, vol. 2. New York: Stosvet Publishing House, 2010.
 "Odessa to Moscow: Pages from My Life" in Semyon Lipkin, Dekada (Moscow, 1990), pp. 5–10. Translated by Rebecca Ruth Gould. Translation and Literature, 21 (2012): Online Supplement.

French translations of Semyon Lipkin’s work 

 Le Destin de Vassili Grossman (L'Age d'Homme 1990) tr Alexis Berelowitch
 L'histoire d'Alim Safarov, écrivain russe du Caucase (Dekada [Decade]). La Tour-d'Aigues: Editions de l'Aube, 2008.

Referenced Works 

 Life and Fate - Vasily Grossman, 1960
 The Return - Andrey Platonov, 1999
 Koba the Dread – Martin Amis, 2002
 Happy Moscow - Andrey Platonov tr. Robert and Elizabeth Chandler, London: Harvill, 2001
 A Writer at War - Vasily Grossman ed. Beever and Vinogradova London: Pimlico, 2006
 Soul and Other Stories - Andrey Platonov tr. Robert and Elizabeth Chandler et al. New York: NYRB Classics, 2007
 The Foundation Pit - Andrey Platonov tr. Robert and Elizabeth Chandler and Olga Meerson, London: Vintage Classics, 2010
 The Road - Vasily Grossman tr. Robert and Elizabeth Chandler, London: Maclehose Press, 2010
 The Reinvention of the Promised Land utopian space and time in Soviet Jewish exodus literature by Klavdiya Smola
 Volume 22 Part 1 Translation and Literature Spring 2013 (Edinburgh University Press) 
 Russian Poet/Soviet Jew: The Legacy of Eduard Bagritsky 
 The Penguin Book of Russian Poetry Edited by Robert Chandler, Boris Dralyuk and Irina Mashinski (Penguin Classics) 2015 
 World Literature as a Communal Apartment: Semyon Lipkin's Ethics of Translation Difference by Rebecca Ruth Gould
 Music from a Speeding Train: Jewish Literature in a Post-Revolution Russia 
 An Anthology of Jewish-Russian Literature Volume 2 1953-2001

Friendship with Vasily Grossman 

In 1961, the manuscript for the novel, Life and Fate, by Vasily Grossman was banned by the Soviet authorities and confiscated by the KGB. Semyon Lipkin saved a copy of his friend's typescript in a bag hanging under some coats on a peg at his dacha at Peredelkino and later passed it over to Elena Makarova and Sergei Makarov for safekeeping in their attic in Khimki, near Moscow. (Elena Makarova was Lipkin's step-daughter, the daughter of his widow the poet Inna Lisnianskaya. Sergei Makarov is Elena's husband.) In 1975 Lipkin asked the writer Vladimir Voinovich and Academician Andrey Sakharov to help to smuggle the manuscript from the USSR and get it published in the West, which eventually happened in 1980. In July 2013, Grossman's manuscript and other papers confiscated by the KGB back in 1961 were finally released from detention and passed by the FSB secret service (former KGB) to the Russian State Archive of Literature and Art (RGALI).

Chronology of historical events impacting Lipkin and his writing 

 In 1931 Stalin ordered enforced collectivization, closed the Kalmyk Buddhist monasteries, and burned religious texts.
 In 1932 Mayakovsky committed suicide, independent literary groups were closed, and the Union of Soviet Writers was formed. In 1932-34 between three and five million peasants died in the Great Famine in the Ukraine. 
 In 1936 Shostakovich's Lady Macbeth of Mtsensk was denounced by the authorities, approximately half of the members of the Soviet political, military and intellectual elite were imprisoned or shot, as were around 250,000 members of the various national minorities whose epics Lipkin translated to Russian or about whom he wrote poems. This period was known as the Great Terror or "Yezhovshchina" - after the Soviet secret police, the N.K.V.D.'s head Nikolay Yezhov. 
 In 1937 Lipkin graduated from the Moscow Economics Engineering Institute. While studying engineering he had begun studying Persian, followed by the other oriental languages including Dagestani, Kalmyk, Kirghiz, Tatar, Tadjik, Uzbek, Kabardinian and others. 
 In 1939 the Molotov—Ribbentrop Pact was signed, the Second World War began and 70,000 mentally handicapped Germans were euthanased by their government.  
 In 1941 Germany invaded the Soviet Union until 1945.
 Lipkin fought in the Red Army as a war correspondent, including at Stalingrad. 
 In December 1942 the Soviets reconquered the Kalmyk ASSR and went on to win a decisive victory at the Battle of Kursk in August 1943, after which Stalin declared all Kalmyks to be Nazi collaborators and deported the entire population of the Kalmyk ASSR, including communists, to prison camps in Siberia and Central Asia in December 1943. 
 In 1941 - 1944 about two million Jews were killed in western areas of the Soviet Union and two and a half million Polish Jews were gassed at Chelmno, Majdanek, Belzec, Sobibor, Treblinka and Auschwitz.
 On January 27, 1944 the Siege of Stalingrad was lifted, between April and June 436,000 Hungarian Jews were gassed at Auschwitz in fifty-six days; between August and October the Warsaw uprising occurred. 
 On January 27, 1945 Auschwitz was liberated, on May 9 Germany surrendered. 
 The Nuremberg trials were held in 1946 and while the Nazi leadership were judged Andrey Zhdanov tightened control over the arts in the USSR. Vasily Grossman's play, "If You Believe the Pythagoreans" was severely criticised.  
 In 1948, Solomon Mikhoels, the  head of Jewish Anti-Fascist Committee, was murdered in January; in November the Committee was dissolved. 
 In 1953 an article was placed in Pravda about the Jewish "Doctors-Murderers" and a purge of Soviet Jews is being prepared. On March 5 Stalin died and on 4 April there was Official acknowledgment that the case against the Jewish doctors was fabricated. 
 In February 1956 the period known as "The Thaw" peaked, in February Khrushchev made his Secret Speech to the Communist Party, denouncing the forcible exile of the Kalmyks, Karachai, Chechen, Ingush, and Balkhars Kabardins. Millions of prisoners were released from the camps. But from October to November the Hungarian insurrection was suppressed.  
 In 1957 some Kalmyks were allowed to return to their native land.
 In July 1958, the former Kalmyk ASSR reconstituted, Doctor Zhivago was published abroad, Pasternak declined the Nobel prize under pressure from the authorities. 
 In 1961 Lipkin's friend, Vasily Grossman's novel Life and Fate was submitted for publication and rejected by the Communist party officials; the KGB raided Grossman's home and seized all the copies they could. Lipkin preserved a copy and clandestinely passed it to the West, where it was eventually published.
 In November 1962 Solzhenitsyn's One Day in the Life of Ivan Denisovich was published in the Soviet Union. 
 In 1964 Khrushchev fell and Vasily Grossman died believing Life and Fate would never be published. Sinyavski and Daniel were tried in 1966.
 In 1967 Lipkin received the Rudaki State Prize of the Tadzhik SSR and his first collection of poetry Ochevidets, (Eyewitness) was published. His poem 'Conjunction' was read as coded support for Israel. 
 In August 1968 the Warsaw Pact invasion of Czechoslovakia took place. 
 In 1968 Lipkin was made the People's Poet of the Kalmyk ASSR. 
 In 1970 the first issue of the Jewish samizdat journal "Exodus" was published, as was Lipkin's second collection, A Notebook of Being. 
 In 1971 Jewish emigration began to be permitted. In 1974 Solzehenitsyn was deported after The Gulag Archipelago was published in Paris in 1973. 
 In 1975 Andrey Sakharov was awarded the Nobel Peace Prize. Lipkin's Vechny Den' (Eternal Day) was published and he asked the writer Vladimir Voinovitch to help him get microfilm of Life and Fate to the West. 
 In 1979 Lipkin and Inna Lisnianskaya submitted their poetry to the anthology "Metropol," which was rejected by the Soviet authorities. 
 In 1980 Lipkin and Inna Lisnianskaya resigned from the Union of Writers. Sakharov was internally exiled by the authorities. Grossman's Life and Fate was finally published in Switzerland, from pages preserved by Lipkin and microfilmed by Sakharov. In 1981 "Metropol" was published in the United States. Lipkin's Volya (variously called Will, Free Will, and Freedom) was published in the U.S. edited by Joseph Brodsky. 
 In 1982 Brezhnev died. 
 In (1984)Andropov died and Lipkin's Kochevoi Ogon' (A Nomadic Flame) was published in the U.S.
 In 1985 Mikhail Gorbachev became general secretary of the Communist Party of the Soviet Union and perestroika began. 
 In 1986 Lipkin's Kartiny i golosa (Pictures and Voices) was published in London and Lipkin was reinstated into the Writers’ Union. 
 In 1988 Gorbachev became president. Pasternak's Doctor Zhivago and Grossman's Life and Fate were published in the Soviet Union. 
 In November 1989 the Berlin Wall fell. In 1991 the USSR collapsed, Lipkin was awarded Tukay Prize, his Lunnyi Svet (Moonlight) and Pis΄mena (Letters) were published. 
 In 1992 civil war broke out in Tajikistan. 
 In 1993 Yeltsin suppressed the reactionary armed rising by the Supreme Soviet in Moscow. 
 In 1995 Lipkin was awarded the Sakharov Prize by the European Parliament, and the Pushkin Prize by the Alfred Topfer Foundation, in Germany. 
 In 1997 Posokh (Shepherd's Crook) was published. 
 In 2000 Putin was elected president and Lipkin's Sem΄ desyatiletii (Seven Decades) was published. 
 March 31, 2003 Semyon Izrailevich Lipkin died at Peredelkino.

References

External links 

 After Semyon Izrailevich Lipkin 1911-2003, Yvonne Green
 Donald Rayfield's Review of Derieva and Lipkin literary works and translations into English
 Biography of the late Semyon Lipkin
 National voice unheard for decades

1911 births
2003 deaths
Writers from Odesa
Odesa Jews
Soviet poets
Soviet male writers
20th-century Russian male writers
Russian male poets
Soviet translators
Russian memoirists
Soviet military personnel of World War II
Soviet journalists
Male journalists
20th-century Russian translators
20th-century journalists
20th-century memoirists